La banda de los tres crisantemos is a 1970 crime film directed by Ignacio F. Iquino, written by Lou Carrigan and Ernesto Gastaldi and starring Dean Reed, Daniel Martín and Fernando Sancho.

Cast

References

External links
 

Films directed by Ignacio F. Iquino
Films produced by Ignacio F. Iquino
Films with screenplays by Ignacio F. Iquino
Films with screenplays by Ernesto Gastaldi
Films based on Spanish novels
Spanish crime films
Films shot in Barcelona
1970 crime films
1970 films